Kuroishi (黒石) may refer to:
Kuroishi, Aomori, a city in Aomori Prefecture
Kuroishi Domain, a feudal domain that existed between 1809 and 1871
The , the jin'ya (administrative headquarters) of the Kuroishi domain
Kuroishi, Ōtoyo, a sub-municipal area in Ōtoyo, Kōchi
Kuroishi, Shimanto, a sub-municipal area in Shimanto, Kōchi